The Sanjak of Çirmen or Chirmen (Ottoman Turkish: Çirmen Sancağı/Liva-i Çirmen) was a second-level Ottoman province (sanjak or liva) encompassing the region of Çirmen (mod. Ormenio in Thrace. It was succeeded in 1829 by the Sanjak of Edirne.

History 
The town of Çirmen ( - Ormenion) was conquered from the Byzantine Empire by the Ottoman Turks in 1371. With some interruptions, it was thereafter the centre of a distinct province (sanjak), first of the Rumelia Eyalet, and after the early 17th century of the Özü Eyalet. The province extended over most of the Rhodope mountains, the middle course of the Maritsa and the upper course of the Tundzha, at times including the city Edirne (Adrianople), which, as a former imperial capital (until 1453) at other times was administered as an independent crown domain. After the disbandment of Özü Eyalet in 1812, Çirmen belonged to Edirne Eyalet, and in 1829, its capital was moved to Edirne.

References

Sources 
 

Ottoman Thrace
Rhodope Mountains
Sanjaks of the Ottoman Empire in Europe
States and territories established in the 1370s
States and territories disestablished in 1829
1370s establishments in the Ottoman Empire
1829 disestablishments in the Ottoman Empire